"Hey, My Love" is a song by Australian singer songwriter Mark Holden. It was released in February 1977 and peaked at number 32 on the Kent Music Report.

Holden performed the song live on Countdown during its 100th episode on 3 April 1977.

Track listing
7"/ Cassette (EMI 11367)
Side A
 "Hey, My Love" - 3:04

Side B
 "We Have Love" - 3:47

Charts

References

External links
 "Hey, My Love" by Mark Holden

1977 songs
Mark Holden songs
1977 singles
Pop ballads
Songs written by Mark Radice